The Women's 100 Backstroke event at the 10th FINA World Swimming Championships (25m) took place 15 – 16 December in Dubai, United Arab Emirates. The heats and semifinals were 15 December; the final was 16 December.

61 swimmers swam the event.

Records
Prior to the competition, the existing world and championship records were as follows.

The following records were established during the competition:

Results

Heats

Semifinals
Semifinal 1

Semifinal 2

Final

References

Backstroke 100 metre, Women's
World Short Course Swimming Championships
2010 in women's swimming